The 2016 WDF Europe Cup was the 20th edition of the WDF Europe Cup darts tournament, organised by the World Darts Federation. It was held in Egmond aan Zee, Netherlands from September 20 to 24.

Medal tally

Entered teams
32 countries/associations entered a men's selection in the event.
26 countries/associations entered a womans's selection in the event.

 
| style="width: 50%;text-align: left; vertical-align: top;  " |

 
| style="width: 50%;text-align: left; vertical-align: top;  " |

Men's singles

Men's Pairs

Men's team
Round Robin

 
| style="text-align: left; vertical-align: top;  " |
Group A

 Norway 9 - 2  Wales
 Norway 9 - 4  Cyprus
 Wales 9 - 0  France
 Wales 9 - 3  Cyprus
 France 9 - 7  Norway
 France 9 - 2  Cyprus
Group B

 Malta 9 - 6  Luxembourg
 Malta 9 - 4  Germany
 Malta 9 - 4  Iceland
 Luxembourg 9 - 8  Germany
 Luxembourg 9 - 5  Iceland
 Germany 9 - 6  Iceland
Group C

 Sweden 9 - 7  Scotland
 Sweden 9 - 3  Gibraltar
 Sweden 9 - 2  Hungary
 Scotland 9 - 2  Gibraltar
 Scotland 9 - 3  Hungary
 Gibraltar 9 - 2  Hungary
Group D

 Netherlands 9 - 3  Poland
 Netherlands 9 - 4  Switzerland
 Netherlands 9 - 1  Turkey
 Poland 9 - 6  Switzerland
 Poland 9 - 4  Turkey
 Switzerland 9 - 3  Turkey
 
| style="text-align: left; vertical-align: top;  " |
Group E

 Northern Ireland 9 - 3  Serbia
 Northern Ireland 9 - 3  Catalonia
 Northern Ireland 9 - 4  Isle of Man
 Serbia 9 - 7  Catalonia
 Serbia 9 - 4  Isle of Man
 Catalonia 9 - 6  Isle of Man
Group F

 Belgium 9 - 3  Lithuania
 Belgium 9 - 6  Latvia
 Belgium 9 - 1  Greece
 Lithuania 9 - 3  Latvia
 Lithuania 9 - 4  Greece
 Latvia 9 - 1  Greece
Group G

 Finland 9 - 5  Denmark
 Finland 9 - 6  Ireland
 Finland 9 - 3  Jersey
 Denmark 9 - 2  Ireland
 Denmark 9 - 3  Jersey
 Ireland 9 - 2  Jersey
Group H

 England 9 - 2  Romania
 England 9 - 1  Czech Republic
 England 9 - 2  Italy
 Romania 9 - 7  Czech Republic
 Romania 9 - 4  Italy
 Czech Republic 9 - 5  Italy

Knock Out

Woman's singles

Woman's Pairs

Woman's Team
Round Robin

 
| style="text-align: left; vertical-align: top;  " |
Group A

 England 9 - 0  Switzerland
 England 9 - 1  Hungary
 England 9 - 0  Belgium
 Switzerland 9 - 8  Hungary
 Switzerland 9 - 4  Belgium
 Hungary 9 - 6  Belgium
Group B

 Czech Republic 9 - 2  Italy
 Czech Republic 9 - 6  Northern Ireland
 Italy 9 - 7  Northern Ireland
Group C

 Germany 9 - 4  Poland
 Germany 9 - 1  Latvia
 Poland 9 - 2  Latvia
Group D

 Finland 9 - 2  Turkey
 Finland 9 - 3  France
 Turkey 9 - 5  France
 
| style="text-align: left; vertical-align: top;  " |
Group E

 Norway 9 - 4  Denmark
 Norway 9 - 3  Iceland
 Denmark 9 - 1  Iceland
Group F

 Wales 9 - 6  Sweden
 Wales 9 - 0  Greece
 Sweden 9 - 4  Greece
Group G

 Ireland 9 - 0  Romania
 Ireland 9 - 5  Lithuania
 Romania 9 - 6  Lithuania
Group H

 Netherlands 9 - 3  Scotland
 Netherlands 9 - 1  Serbia
 Netherlands 9 - 0  Isle of Man
 Scotland 9 - 3  Serbia
 Scotland 9 - 3  Isle of Man
 Serbia 9 - 4  Isle of Man

Knock Out

References

Darts tournaments